Sergei Vladimirovich Avagimyan (born 5 July 1989) is an Armenian former professional football player. Avagimyan was born in Russia to parents of Armenian descent.

Career

Club
In January 2016, Avagimyan signed for Armenian Premier League side FC Ararat Yerevan. Avagimyan was told he could leave Ararat Yerevan in August 2016.

International
Avagimyan made his debut for the Armenia national football team in a 4-0 friendly win over El Salvador in 2016.

Career statistics

International

Statistics accurate as of match played 1 June 2016

References

External links
 Career summary at sportbox.ru  
 

1989 births
Living people
Armenian footballers
Armenia international footballers
Russian footballers
Russian people of Armenian descent
Sportspeople from Kaluga
Association football midfielders
FC Baikal Irkutsk players
FC Ararat Moscow players
FC Spartak Kostroma players